Cementir Holding S.p.A., incorporated in 1947 in Rome, Italy, is a holding company with subsidiaries manufacturing cement and concrete, principally in Turkey and Denmark. The holding is the leading producer of cement in Denmark and of ready-mix concrete in Scandinavia, as well as one of the main producers in Turkey. It also has a significant presence in Italy. The company's products include pre-cast concrete for the engineering and transport sectors. Its research and development activities are based in Denmark and Italy.

Cementir, like the rest of the cement industry, needs to mitigate its climate impacts. Carbon Disclosure Project rated them as a "B" rated organization December 2020, after previously getting an F rating.

In February 1992, to satisfy the recommendations of Brussels on the limitation of the public enterprise competition in the competitive economy domain, the IRI-Finsider Group held the majority of capital (51.78%) in the Italian construction group. Caltagirone S.p.A. for the sum of 480 billion ₤ ires.

In 2001, the Cementir group was housed at the Bourse de Milan.

In September 2017, Cementir announced the sale of its activities in Italy to HeidelbergCement for 315 million euros.

Board of directors

The following people serve on the board of directors as of December 2013:

 President: Francesco Caltagirone Jr.
 Vice President: Carlo Carlevaris (independent)
 Chief Executive Officer: Francesco Caltagirone Jr.
 Board Member: Alessandro Caltagirone
 Board Member: Azzurra Caltagirone
 Board Member: Edoardo Caltagirone
 Board Member: Saverio Caltagirone
 Board Member: Flavio Cattaneo (independent)
 Board Member: Mario Ciliberto
 Board Member: Paolo Di Bendetto (independent)
 Board Member: Fabio Corsico
 Board Member: Mario Delfini
 Board Member: Alfio Marchini (independent)
 Board Member: Riccardo Nicolini
 Board Member: Mario Ciliberto

See also
Aalborg Portland

References

Cement companies of Italy
Holding companies of Italy
Manufacturing companies based in Rome
Multinational companies headquartered in Italy
Holding companies established in 1947
Italian companies established in 1947
Companies listed on the Borsa Italiana
Italian brands